The Federal Ministry of Finance, abbreviated BMF, is the cabinet-level finance ministry of Germany, with its seat at the Detlev-Rohwedder-Haus in Berlin and a secondary office in Bonn. The current Federal Minister of Finance is Christian Lindner (FDP).

History
In German politics, the Ministry of Finance beside the Interior, Foreign, Justice and Defence ministries is counted as one of the "classical portfolios" (denoted by the definite article der), which were also part of the first German government under Otto von Bismarck following the Unification of 1871.

Fiscal policy in the German Empire was predominantly the domain of the various states responsible for all direct taxation according to the 1833 Zollverein treaties. The federal government merely received indirect contributions from the states. Matters of fiscal policy at the federal level initially was the exclusive responsibility of the German Chancellery under Otto von Bismarck. However, in 1877 a special finance department was established, which with effect from 14 July 1879 was separated from the chancellery as the Imperial Treasury (Reichsschatzamt), a federal agency in its own right. With its seat vis-à-vis on Wilhelmplatz in Berlin, it was first headed by a subsecretary, and from 1880 by a Secretary of State only answerable to the chancellor.

After World War I, the newly established Weimar Republic had to face huge reparations and a fiscal emergency. To cope with the implications, the former Reichsschatzamt in 1919 was re-organised as a federal ministry, the Reichsministerium der Finanzen, as supreme financial authority headed by a federal minister. Besides a Reich Treasury Ministry (Reichsschatzministerium) was established for the administration of the federal property, both agencies were merged in 1923.

Already in the German cabinet of Chancellor Franz von Papen, Undersecretary Lutz Graf Schwerin von Krosigk was appointed Finance Minister in 1932, an office he held throughout the Nazi era until 1945. The ministry played a vital role in financing the German re-armament, in the "Aryanization" of Jewish property ("Reich Flight Tax"), German war economy, and the plundering of occupied countries in World War II. The budget deficit had already reached heady heights on the eve of the war, aggrandised by hidden Mefo and Oeffa bill financing. In turn, saving banks and credit institutions were obliged to sign war bonds while price stability was enforced by government intervention and the German public was called up to bank surplus money.

After World War II the ministry was re-established in 1949 and renamed the West German Bundesministerium der Finanzen. Since 1999, the Detlev-Rohwedder-Haus (former Air Ministry Building) in Berlin has been the headquarters of the ministry.

During the period of Reunification in the 1990s', the Ministry of Finance headed by Theo Waigel, refused to return eight buildings in East Germany belonging to six Austrian Jewish citizens / NS victims. Allgemeine Judische Wochenzeitung; 10 September 1992; "Expropriation through the back door; German Government adds to its coffers / Loopholes in German bureaucracy make Injustice permanent." ("Enteignung durch die Hintertur; Der Bund bereichert sich / Winkelzuge deutscher Burocratie schreiben Unrecht fest").

Structure and function 

The Ministry is the supreme federal authority in revenue administration and governs a number of subordinate federal, intermediate, and local authorities such as the Federal Centre for Data Processing and Information Technology (ZIVIT). The Ministry's wider portfolio includes public-law agencies and corporations such as the Federal Finance Regulator (BaFin) and Real Estate regulatory bodies. The finance minister is the only cabinet minister who can veto a decision of the government if it would lead to additional expenditure. The German newspaper FAZ stated, the Ministry of Finance is the most important Ministry in the German government.

The Finance Ministry is responsible for all aspects of tax and revenue policy in Germany and plays a significant role in European Union policy. It has nine directorates-general:

 Directorate-General Z (Central Services): Deals with all ministerial organizational matters, including human resources, IT, occupational training, management, and administration
 Directorate-General L (Leading, Strategy and communication): Coordinates strategy development and policy planning to advance decision-making processes, also manages the ministry's relations with the parliament and federal cabinet
 Directorate-General I (Fiscal and Macroeconomic Affairs): Determines the strategic focus of the Ministry's fiscal policy instruments, forecasts public budget trends and conducts macroeconomic research
 Directorate-General II (Federal Budget): Responsible for drawing up the federal budget by calculating revenue and spending for each government policy area.
 Directorate-General III (Customs and Excise): Responsible for levying customs and excise duties, as well as for monitoring cross-border goods traffic.
 Directorate-General IV (Taxation): Together with the other member states of the EU, the Ministry works to improve coordination among the different systems of taxes.
 Directorate-General V (Financial Relations and Law): Coordinates financial relations between central, regional and local governments. Also responsible for public law, legal affairs, and handling proceedings before Germany's Federal Constitutional Court and the European courts. Furthermore, this directorate-general deals with settlement of war burdens, compensation for National Socialist injustices, and unresolved property issues in eastern Germany
 Directorate-General VII (Financial Market Policy): Manages the federal debt, including issuance of securities for financial markets and private investors which ensure the budgeted volume of credit is obtained when needed and at market rates. Also responsible for the Bundesbank and the European Central Bank. Shapes the legal framework for financial markets through its capital market policy and exercises legal supervision over the German financial watchdog agency BaFin.
 Directorate-General VIII (Privatisation): Sets the policy for managing state holdings which is then undertaken by individual government departments. Operates a real estate institute that markets properties that the German Government no longer needs, and operates standardised facility management for federal properties.
 Directorate-General E (European Policy): Responsible for coordinating the German Government's European economic and financial policy under the EU Treaty.

Subordinate agencies

The federal ministry directly governs the following agencies:

Higher federal authorities
Federal Central Tax Office (BZSt)
Federal Office of Central Services and Unresolved Property Issues (BADV)
Federal Equalisation of Burdens Office (BAA)
Federal Spirits Monopoly Administration (BfB)
Intermediate and local authorities
Customs Administration
Customs Investigation Bureau (ZKA)
5 Federal finance offices
43 local customs offices
8 local customs investigation offices
Other agencies
Centre for Data Processing and Information Technology (ZIVIT)
Training and Knowledge Centre (BWZ)

Legally independent entities in the Ministry's wider portfolio include:
Federal Financial Supervisory Authority (BaFin)
Financial Market Stabilisation Fund (SoFFin)
Federal Agency for Financial Market Stabilisation (FMSA)
Institute for Federal Real Estate (BImA)
Federal Institute for Special Tasks Arising from Unification (BvS)
Federal Posts and Telecommunications Agency (BAnst PT)
Federal Pensions Service for Posts and Telecommunications (BPS-PT)
Posts and Telecommunications Accident Fund (UKPT)
Museum Foundation for Posts and Telecommunications (MusStiftPT)

Federal Ministers of Finance

Political Party:

See also
 German budget process

References

External links
 Official website 

Finance
Germany
Public finance of Germany